The Jabodebek LRT Cibubur Line is one of the two light rail line of the Jabodebek LRT which will connect  to  station, which is about 25.94 km in length. The line adopts elevated construction and stops at twelve stations.

Its Pancoran–Harjamukti section runs along the Jakarta Inner Ring Road and Jagorawi Toll Road. The planned next phase would extend the line to Bogor.

History 

Just like other public transportation systems in Jabodetabek, the Greater Jakarta LRT system was built to break down congestion. The construction of the Cawang-Cibubur LRT Line and other lines in the first phase of the Greater Jakarta LRT construction began with the groundbreaking on 9 September 2015 by President Joko Widodo. The groundbreaking ceremony was carried out near the planned TMII Station which is included in this LRT route.

Initially, the construction of phase 1 was targeted to be completed before the 2018 Asian Games. However, until the Asian Games were held, the overall development for phase 1 itself was still 45%. Even so, at that time several lines in the Cawang–Cibubur service route had already begun to be fitted with rails.

In March 2019, the entire track line has been connected. All elevated construction work has been completed and continued with signaling work and station construction. Therefore, this line is estimated to be ready for the trial run of the LRT series considering that the other lines have not yet completed their track construction.

On October 11, 2019, the first series of Jabodebek LRT arrived in Jakarta. The shipment was carried out by land directly from the PT INKA Madiun Factory. For the time being, the LRT series has been parked near Harjamukti Station. This wad done considering that the construction of the LRT depot in Jatimulya has not yet been completed.

In October 2020, the Greater Jakarta LRT fleet began trials. This trial was carried out on the Cawang–Cibubur service route with the TMII Station–Harjamukti Station route. This trial was conducted to check signaling readiness and the path to be traversed.

Network

Route 
The Cibubur Line has a track length of 25.94 kilometers. Most of the trajectory of this route is using an elevated structure. From Dukuh Atas station to Cawang station, this line shares the route with Lin Bekasi, goes along Jalan Rasuna Said then turns to cross to the south side of the Cawang-Pluit Toll Road. After Cawang station, the two lines split and this line follows the Jagorawi Toll Road alignment. From Cawang Station to TMII Station, the route changes from the west side to the east side of the toll road. Between the Cawang – TMII plots, there is a path made above ground level because it is close to the approach zone of Halim Perdanakusuma Airport. After TMII Station, the route moves back to the west side of the toll road to Harjamukti Station.

List of stations

Future development 
In the phase 2 construction plan, the LRT line is planned to be extended to Bogor along with the Dukuh Atas-Senayan service line. The Cibubur-Bogor route is planned to be built on the ground, not elevated like the Cawang-Cibubur route. This above-ground building model is considered to save construction costs by up to 50%. Until now, the Cibubur-Bogor route is still in the design planning process.

Incidents 
On October 25, 2021, 2 LRT train series had an accident while undergoing trials on this line, parallel to the Jakarta-Bogor-Ciawi Toll Road.

References

Standard gauge railways in Indonesia
Railway lines in Indonesia